Golden Ears Provincial Park is a Provincial park in British Columbia, Canada and is . It is named after the prominent twin peaks which are commonly referred to as Golden Ears (Mount Blanshard). The park was originally part of Garibaldi Provincial Park (established 1927) but was split off as a separate park in 1967. Golden Ears Provincial Park is situated in the unceded traditional territories of the Coast Salish people. The area was logged extensively in the 1920s by the Lougheed and Abernathy Logging Company. Many recreational attractions are found within the park. Golden Ears Provincial Park is a protected area that contains many endangered species of flora and fauna.

First Nations territory 
The area encompassed by Golden Ears Provincial Park sits within the traditional territory of the Coast Salish people. The following is a list of First Nations whose traditional territories include all or part of Golden Ears Provincial Park.

 Katzie First Nation
 Kwantlen First Nation
 Matsqui First Nation
 Sts'Ailes people
 Tsawwassen First Nation
 Stó꞉lō Nation
 In-SHUCK-ch Nation
 St’at’imc/Lillooet Tribal Council

Traditional use 
Historically, the area enclosed by the boundaries of Golden Ears Provincial Park provided an important source of sustenance and resources for the local First Nations. The Katzie First Nation traditionally used the areas in what are now the southern and western sections of the park for hunting and fishing. Several sites of cultural importance to the Katzie First Nation are also enclosed within the boundaries of the park. The St’at’imc/Lillooet people traditionally used the northern area of what is now Golden Ears Park as a trade corridor. The Kwantlen First Nation traditionally used what is now the southeastern portion of the park for hunting and trapping.

Some examples of animals that were traditionally hunted by the local First Nations include mule deer, Roosevelt elk, mountain goat, black bear, North American beaver, and American marten. Archeological studies of the area indicate that fishing around Alouette Lake has been taking place for several thousand years. Fish that were historically harvested in Alouette Lake and Alouette River include five different species of Pacific salmon, steelhead, sturgeon, and trout. Many species of plants were historically gathered in the area, including but not limited to cedar bark, Wapato (Sagittaria latifolia), cranberries, and other types of berries.

Current use 
The local First Nations whose territory is included within the park have retained their rights to gather resources within the park boundaries. Hunting and trapping are only permitted for individuals who belong to one of the local Nations. The Katzie Cultural Education Society provides some educational programs at the Outdoor Learning Centre in the park.

First Nations involvement in management decisions 
The Order in Council that created Golden Ears Provincial Park as a separate entity from Garibaldi Park makes no mention of First Nations involvement in this decision. BC Parks has made a commitment to include First Nations voices in the decision-making processes for management of Golden Ears Provincial Park. One core ideal outlined in the Golden Ears Park Management Plan is that the park must allow for the local First Nations to continue their traditional practices, such as hunting and gathering. Opportunities for park visitors to learn about First Nations culture relevant to the park area are also part of the core ideals of the Golden Ears Park Management Plan.

The Katzie First Nation has done significant work to ensure that their traditional territories are being managed according to their principles. The Katzie First Nation has been involved in efforts to bring spawning salmon to Alouette Lake, which was blocked by the creation of a dam on Alouette River in 1928; these efforts have been made in partnership with BC Hydro and the Alouette River Management Society. The Katzie First Nation has also been involved in a study of plant diversity and abundance in the Alouette Lake riparian zone.

Industrial history 
In 1897 a copper mine was developed along the east side Pitt Lake in Golden Ears Park. The mine title changed hands many times prior to closure during the Great Depression. Pitt Lake's lost gold mine is a legend of an Indigenous man named Slumach who was aware of a large gold deposit in the park. The History Channel produced a show, Deadman's Curse, which aired in July 2022 documenting the search for the gold and research into Slumach. 

Timber harvest in the 1920s by the Lougheed and Abernathy Logging Company was extensive and at one point the largest in North America. In 1929, a large forest fire consumed 60,000 hectares of forest and halted logging in the area. Most of the old growth cedar and hemlock was either logged or lost in the wildfire. 

In 1926, BC Hydro constructed the Alouette Dam on Allouette Lake for power generation. The Alouette reservoir is connected to Stave Lake via a diversion tunnel.

History and creation of Golden Ears Provincial Park 
The Golden Ears Provincial Park was named after the twin peaks of Mount Blanshard. In 1933, the area that is now Golden Ears Park was incorporated into Garibaldi Provincial Park because of the scenic and recreational value of the area. Golden Ears Provincial Park is 62,539 hectares of protected area designated as separate from Garibaldi Provincial Park in 1967 primarily for the appreciation of the barrier between Golden Ears and Garibaldi areas. The creation of Golden Ears Provincial Park allowed more focus to be placed on the recreational elements available in the region surrounding Alouette Lake.  The park is often used for hiking, horseback riding, and boating. The expansion of highways increased the accessibility of Golden Ears Provincial Park, which led to the rise in popularity of camping in the area.

Golden Ears Park management plan

Purpose and objectives 
Golden Ears Park is one of the largest and most popular parks in British Columbia, attracting an average of 610,000 visitors every year. Following the park's heightened popularity and continued increase in foot traffic, the province of British Columbia enacted the official Golden Ears Park Management Plan in November of 2013, to preserve the natural beauty and ecological components of the park. The plan highlights the park's unique features and significant amenities, including its cultural, natural, and recreational values.

Protecting and maintaining wildlife populations 
Ecological conservation initiatives have been put in place to preserve the park’s natural ecosystem and protect the wildlife that inhabit Golden Ears from the impacts of repeated recreational activity. Erosion is a common issue that the management plan addresses: erosion from hiking trails due to heavy foot traffic, and shoreline erosion caused by water sports and recreational boating. The province plans to collaborate with regulatory agencies to mitigate erosion concerns. There are also research plans in place to develop a deeper understanding of the park's wildlife populations, and supporting recovery initiatives for endangered species.

Species at risk 
Over 85 BC Red listed species have been documented in Golden Ears Park. Some Red listed species that may be found in Golden Ears Park are Actaea elata, spotted owl, monarch butterfly, and the sage thrasher. The aforementioned species are registered as endangered in Schedule 1 of the Species at Risk Act (SARA). Many other BC Red listed species can also be found in the park. The Government of British Columbia has documented 1824 Blue listed species in Golden Ears Park, such as grizzly bears. Western population grizzly bears are registered as a species of special concern in Schedule 1 of SARA.

Vegetation in the park 

Golden Ears Park is home to three eco-sections within its borders, Eastern Pacific Ranges, Southern Pacific Ranges, and the Fraser Lowlands. Within the three eco-sections lies a large diversity of plants, including ferns, treez, and wildflowers. Ferns often observed include the Western sword fern, leathery grape fern, American parsley fern, and the common bracken. Douglas fir are present in the higher elevations of Golden Ears Park. Other plant species that are often observed include the Himalayan blackberry, salmonberry, snow bramble, skunk cabbage, and knotweed.

Invasive species 
The Himalayan blackberry and the knotweed family are both non-native species to British Columbia. Himalayan blackberry are known to grow over top of low-growing plants, and become very dense to the point of limiting the movement of other animals in the area. The Golden Ears Management Plan was to outline a vision for the future use(s) of the park, and explains in detail goals that BC Parks has for managing of the spread and preventing the introductions of invasive species in the 56,000-hectare park.

Endemic species 
With the multitude of ecology management plans currently underway and efforts being made by many sectors of the public, native species of plants found in British Columbia are able to live, grow and regain previously strained population numbers within the protected areas of BC Parks such as Golden Ears. Golden Ears Provincial Park lends itself to being a protected area for many endemic species of trees in Canada. Sitka spruce, western white pine, Douglas fir, and mountain hemlock trees are all considered to be endemic to the Pacific Northwest, and are protected within the park boundary in order to preserve the habitat that these red and blue listed species live in.

Aside from the tree populations found within the park, there are many endangered plant species that are native to British Columbia that can be found thriving in Golden Ears Provincial Park, species such as coastal wood ferns, Menzies' Burnet, and snow bramble.

Camping 
There are three main campgrounds at Golden Ears Park, with a total capacity of 409 vehicle accessible campsites. There are also backcountry campsites available at the park, also known as "Walk-In/Wilderness Camping". These Campsites are available at Alder Flats on the West Canyon Trail and Panorama Ridge on the Golden Ears Trail, but no facilities are provided. Finally, there are two group campgrounds available for reservation, by any group booking a minimum of 15 adults, with a maximum total of 50 persons.

Alouette Campground 
The Alouette campground is the largest of the three main campgrounds in the park, with 206 campsites on it. During the summer season, park operators host security patrols. Only during the summer months the park provides drinking water that is regularly monitored, water is not available during the winter or fall season. The summer season is considered to be between June 19 - September 7, and reservations can be made between June 19 - September 6. There are 83 reserveable  campsites in Alouette. In the campground, there are amenities such as:
 Visitor parking (1)
 Pit toilets (7)
 Flush toilets (4)
 Self guided trails (1)
 Playgrounds (1)
 Shower buildings (2)
 Drinking water taps (23)

Gold Creek Campground 
Gold Creek campground is the second largest of the three main campgrounds in the park, with 148 campsites on it. During the summer season, park operators host security patrols. Only during the summer months the park provides drinking water that is regularly monitored, water is not available during the winter or fall season. Gold Creek is the only campground of the three that is open year-round, however like the other campgrounds, amenities are restricted during the winter months. The summer season is considered to be between April 1 - October 12, and reservations can be made between May 8 - September 6. There are 74 reserveable campsites in Gold Creek. The winter months are considered to be between October 12 - March 31. In the campground, there are amenities such as:
 Visitor parking (1)
 Pit toilets (8)
 Self guided trails (1)
 Shower buildings (2)
 Drinking water taps (15)

North Beach Campground 
North Beach campground is the smallest of the three main campgrounds in the park, with 55 campsites on it. During the summer season, park operators host security patrols. Only during the summer months the park provides drinking water that is regularly monitored, water is not available during the winter or fall season. The summer season is considered to be between June 19 - September 7, and reservations can be made between June 19 - September 6. There are 53 reserveable campsites in North Beach. In the campground, there are amenities such as:
 Visitor parking (1)
 Pit toilets (3)
 Drinking water taps (1)

Walk-in/wilderness camping 
Wilderness/walk-in camping is permitted at Alder Flats on the West Canyon Trail and Panorama Ridge on the Golden Ears Trail, with pit toilets at both sites.  The distance from parking to the walk-in sites at Alder Flats is approximately five kilometres; and to Panorama Ridge is approximately nine kilometres. Camping is on individual gravel pads in wooded area at Alder Flats and in an undeveloped wooded area on Panorama Ridge. There are no campfires are allowed in Wilderness/walk-in camping, only portable camp stoves are permitted. In addition, you must pack out what you pack in, as there are no garbage removal services. Because of the very remote location of these campsites, park operators are not able to provide current information on the sites.

Rustic Marine Campsites 
Rustic marine campsites are located on Alouette Lake at Moyer Creek, The Narrows and Alouette River (north end of the lake). There are no campfires are allowed in Wilderness/walk-in camping, only portable camp stoves are permitted. In addition, you must pack out what you pack in, as there are no garbage removal services. Because of the very remote location of these campsites, park operators are not able to provide current information on the sites.

Hiking 

There is an extensive network of hiking trails in the park ranging from short walks to strenuous backcountry trips.

Golden Ears Trail 
This trail takes you to the Northern summit of the Golden Ears massif. The trail is approximately 12 km one-way from the west canyon parking lot with an elevation gain of 1,500 metres. This is mostly a wilderness trail after the Alder Flats campsite, which is located a few kilometres from the parking lot. There are plenty of great camping spots along the ridge, however there is no permanent source of water. In 2017 Parks BC build six tent platforms near the summit of Golden Ears. Depending on the season, water can be melted from the snow fields that remain in the northern shadow of the peak and there is often freshwater flowing from a creek near the top. Views from the top are panoramic, overlooking the Fraser Valley to the south and surrounding peaks.

Canoeing 
Canoeing is very popular on Alouette Lake. Canoe/kayak/pedal boat rentals are available for rent in the Alouette (South Beach) day-use area on weekends only from May long weekend to late June and daily from late June to Labour Day (weather permitting).

Climbing 
There are no recommended technical climbing opportunities in Golden Ears Park. There are two mountains accessible by official trails that require intermediate skills to reach the peaks. Both are long strenuous hikes requiring proper equipment and experience.

Horseback riding 
Check the park map for horse specific trails. Horses are not permitted on trails other than those designated on the park map. A permit is only required for commercial use of the horse trails.

Day-use stopover is permitted at the South Beach corral area, but horses must remain within the corral or on a designated horse trail.

This park provides trails only; horseback riding lesson/rentals, stables etc. are not available within the park.

Incidents 
Some incidents have resulted in the injury to or death of park patrons.

For example, in July 2018, police received a call from BC Ambulance that a 21 year old man had been swept away by the current from Gold Creek in Golden Ears Provincial Park. A second man tried to help, and both were carried over the falls. The second man was found downstream with non-life-threatening injuries and was transported to hospital. Ridge Meadows Search and Rescue (RMSAR) was deployed, and though an initial search did not find the first man, when the search continued the following morning, a body was found and recovered.

The previous year, in April 2017, emergency services were called to Golden Ears Provincial Park after receiving a report of a man being swept away by swift water in Gold Creek.

In September 2015, Ridge Meadows RCMP were called to Alouette Lake in Golden Ears Provincial Park after a boat capsized on the lake. Four friends had experienced engine troubles with their 15-foot craft, and after pulling in to North Beach to check it out, were later swamped by a large wave. The boat took on water and sunk. Two of the boaters made it to shore and found campers at Gold Creek, while a third made it to shore and headed into the Alouette campground. The three survivors were treated for hypothermia, and released from a hospital a day later. Members of the Maple Ridge Fire Department, Ridge Meadows RCMP, British Columbia Ambulance Service, Ridge Meadows SAR, RCMP Air 1, British Columbia Ambulance Service's Air Ambulance searched for the fourth missing boater. The woman was never found and presumed deceased.

In July 2013, a 21-year-old man drowned in what appeared to have been a swimming accident in the park.

Filming location 

The 2022 series Deadman's Curse
The 2022 movie The Adam Project
The 2014 movie Dawn of the Planet of the Apes credits being shot in Golden Ears Provincial Park.
The 2014 movie Godzilla shot a scene on North Beach in the park.
The 2010 movie The Lightning Thief shot scenes in the park.
The 2008 movie Twilight (starring Robert Pattinson and Kristen Stewart) shot some of its outdoor forest scenes in the park.
The 1982 movie First Blood (starring Sylvester Stallone as Rambo) was shot in Golden Ears Provincial Park.
Annanna & Kristina's Grocery Bag, a documentary shot a scene in the park.

See also
Golden Ears Bridge, a 6 laned bridge across the Fraser River, completed and open to traffic in June 2009.

References

External links
Official site with camping and hiking information, several maps, etc.
Golden Ears Provincial Park at the Canadian Mountain Encyclopedia
short film clip of Alouette Lake in 1959
Gold Creek Falls hiking information.

Lower Mainland
Provincial parks of British Columbia
1967 establishments in British Columbia
Protected areas established in 1967